Midtre Skagastølstind is one of the peaks constituting Skagastølstindane ("Skagastøl peaks") in the Hurrungane mountain range. The mountain lies in between Nordre Skagastølstind, Vetle Skagastølstind, and Store Skagastølstind.

Name
The first element is the genitive of the name of the mountain farm Skagastølen and the last element is tind which means "mountain peak".  The mountain farm (dairy farm) Skagastølen belongs to the farm Skagen in Luster and  stølen is the finite form of støl which means "mountain farm". Skagen is the finite form of skage which means "headland" or "promontory" and the name is equivalent with the famous Skagen in Denmark.  The word midtre means "the one in the middle".

References

Mountains of Vestland
Jotunheimen
Luster, Norway